This is a list of people who have served as Vice-Admiral of Yorkshire.

Reginald Beseley 1559–1563 (also Vice-Admiral of Northumberland 1559–, Vice-Admiral of Cumberland 1559-1563 and Vice-Admiral of Durham 1559–1563 and Vice-Admiral of Westmorland 1559–?)
William Eure, 2nd Baron Eure 1563–1564
Thomas Awchon 1564–1565
Anthony Bevercottes 1565–1569
Sir Henry Gates 1569–1573 (MP for Yorkshire)
Henry Clinton, Lord Clinton 1573–1578 (also Vice-Admiral of Lincolnshire  bef. 1569 – aft. 1576)
 no incumbent 1578–1583
Francis Cholmley 1583–1585
William Howard 1585 
Sir John Stanhope 1585–1604
Edmund Sheffield, 1st Earl of Mulgrave 1604–1646
Edmund Sheffield, 2nd Earl of Mulgrave 1646–1651 (Parliamentary)
 Luke Robinson 1651–1652 (Parliamentary)
Edmund Sheffield, 2nd Earl of Mulgrave 1652–1658 (Parliamentary)
John Sheffield, 3rd Earl of Mulgrave 1659–1692 (also Vice-Admiral of Northumberland 1687–1689 and Vice-Admiral of Durham 1687–1689)
Arthur Ingram, 3rd Viscount of Irvine 1692–1702
Charles Boyle, 2nd Earl of Burlington 1702–1704
Henry Boyle, 1st Baron Carleton 1704–1715
Richard Boyle, 3rd Earl of Burlington 1715–1753
vacant
Charles Watson-Wentworth, 2nd Marquess of Rockingham 1755–1763
Robert Darcy, 4th Earl of Holdernesse 1763–1776
Charles Watson-Wentworth, 2nd Marquess of Rockingham 1776–1782
vacant
Francis Osborne, 5th Duke of Leeds 1795–1799
vacant
Henry Phipps, 1st Earl of Mulgrave 1809–1831
vacant
Albert Denison, 1st Baron Londesborough 1853–1860

References
Institute of Historical Research

Yorkshire
Vice-Admirals
Vice-Admirals
Military history of Yorkshire
Vice-admirals